DNA replication licensing factor MCM5 is a protein that in humans is encoded by the MCM5 gene.

Function 

The protein encoded by this gene is structurally very similar to the CDC46 protein from S. cerevisiae, a protein involved in the initiation of DNA replication. The encoded protein is a member of the MCM family of chromatin-binding proteins and can interact with at least two other members of this family. The encoded protein is upregulated in the transition from the G0 to G1/S phase of the cell cycle and may actively participate in cell cycle regulation.

See also 
Mini Chromosome Maintenance

Interactions 

MCM5 has been shown to interact with:
 Cell division cycle 7-related protein kinase, 
 MCM2, 
 MCM3, 
 MCM7, 
 ORC2L, 
 ORC6L, and
 STAT1.

References

Further reading